Ahmed Tarbi (born 23 May 1954) is an Algerian weightlifter. He competed at the 1980 Summer Olympics and the 1984 Summer Olympics.

References

External links
 

1954 births
Living people
Algerian male weightlifters
Olympic weightlifters of Algeria
Weightlifters at the 1980 Summer Olympics
Weightlifters at the 1984 Summer Olympics
Place of birth missing (living people)
20th-century Algerian people